Yokel Boy is a 1942 American comedy film directed by Joseph Santley and written by Isabel Dawn. It is based on the 1939 play Yokel Boy by Lew Brown. The film stars Albert Dekker, Joan Davis, Eddie Foy Jr., Alan Mowbray, Roscoe Karns and Mikhail Rasumny. The film was released on March 13, 1942, by Republic Pictures.

Plot
Hollywood studio boss R. B. Harris is desperate for a box-office hit.  Reading about a young man in Kansas who has gained a reputation as the movies' number one fan, Harris summons him, Joe Ruddy, to ask his advice about a new gangster story. Joe suggests hiring a real gangster. Joe goes to Chicago to see the notorious "Buggsy" Malone, first trying a nightclub where Buggsie's sister Molly is the featured singer. Molly manages to coax her brother into doing the movie, eager to get him to give up his criminal ways and even hiding a million dollars of his cash until he turns over a new leaf.

On the movie set, leading lady Vera Valaize is irate about the casting and Buggsie's rewriting of the scenes, so she walks off.  Molly is asked by her brother to take over the part. During a bank robbery scene shot on location, a couple of Buggsie's cronies hatch a scheme to actually rob the bank. By the time Buggsie straightens everything out, he finds out Molly's fallen in love with Joe and arranges their wedding on the way home.

Cast  
Albert Dekker as 'Buggsy' Malone
Joan Davis as Molly Malone
Eddie Foy Jr. as Joe Ruddy
Alan Mowbray as R.B. Harris 
Roscoe Karns as Al Devers
Mikhail Rasumny as Amatoff
Lynne Carver as Vera Valaize
Marc Lawrence as Henchman Trigger
Tom Dugan as Professor
James C. Morton as Sign Painter
Pierre Watkin as Johnson
Marilyn Hare as Stenographer

References

External links
 

1942 films
1940s English-language films
American comedy films
1942 comedy films
Republic Pictures films
Films directed by Joseph Santley
American black-and-white films
1940s American films